Plum Creek is a stream in Stearns County, in the U.S. state of Minnesota. It is a tributary of the Mississippi River.

Plum Creek was named for the wild plum trees lining its banks.

See also
List of rivers of Minnesota

References

Rivers of Stearns County, Minnesota
Rivers of Minnesota